Sysy-Meyite (Sıhıı Meyiite) is a rural locality (a selo), and one of two settlements in Sartansky Rural Okrug of Verkhoyansky District in the Sakha Republic, Russia, in addition to Yunkyur, the administrative center of the Rural Okrug. Its population as of the 2010 Census was 46; down from 108 recorded in the 2002 Census.

References

Notes

Sources
Official website of the Sakha Republic. Registry of the Administrative-Territorial Divisions of the Sakha Republic. Verkhoyansky District. 

Rural localities in Verkhoyansky District